British Tar was launched at Whitby in 1814. She became a Liverpool-based merchantman, trading across the Atlantic with North America until she was wrecked in August 1840.

Career
British Tar first appeared in Lloyd's Register (LR) in 1815.

Fate
British Tar, Blenkhorn, master, ran aground on the Arklow Bank, in the Irish Sea off the coast of County Wicklow, on 14 August 1840 and subsequently became a wreck. The coastguard rescued the crew, all of whom but Blenkhorn, deserted her. She was on a voyage from Saint John, New Brunswick to Liverpool with a cargo of timber. British Tar floated off on 17 August and drifted down the channel. She was later reported to have gone to pieces.

Her entry in the 1840 issue of LR bears the annotation "Wrecked".

Citations and references
Citations

References
 

1814 ships
Ships built in Whitby
Age of Sail merchant ships of England
Maritime incidents in August 1840